Russian military-focused secondary schools are usual secondary schools conducting secondary general education programme (level 3 according International Standard Classification of Education (ISCED). They provide their pupils with training in additional military-focused subjects. These schools don't prepare military personnel, and their graduates can choose either military or civilian way of life. These schools include: the Suvorov Military Schools, the Nakhimov Naval Schools and the Presidential Cadet Schools.

Suvorov Schools 
Under the Ministry of Defence:

Kazan Suvorov Military School
 Moscow Military Music College
 Moscow Suvorov Military School
 North Caucasus Suvorov Military School
 Perm Suvorov Military School
 Saint Petersburg Suvorov Military School
 Tula Suvorov Military School
 Tver Suvorov Military School
 Ulyanovsk Suvorov Military School
 Ussuriysk Suvorov Military School
 Yekaterinburg Suvorov Military School

Under the Ministry of Internal Affairs:
 Astrakhan Suvorov Military School of the Ministry of Internal Affairs
 Grozny Suvorov Military School of the Ministry of Internal Affairs
 Yelabuga Suvorov Military School of the Ministry of Internal Affairs
 Novocherkassk Suvorov Military School of the Ministry of Internal Affairs
 Saint Petersburg Suvorov Military School of the Ministry of Internal Affairs
 Chita Suvorov Military School of the Ministry of Internal Affairs

Nakhimov School 
 Saint Petersburg Nakhimov Naval School (main campus is located in Saint Petersburg, there are branches in Vladivostok, Sevastopol, Kaliningrad, Murmansk) Founded in 1944 and located in St. Petersburg in an impressive baroque building adjacent to the Russian cruiser Aurora, the Navy's oldest commissioned warship and the ship that has been credited with signaling the beginning of the October Revolution, this institution can be considered a naval preparatory school.  Successful graduates from its program can directly enter the officer commissioning schools without sitting for the competitive entrance examinations.  Originally, the Nakhimov Schools and their army equivalents, the Suvorov Schools, were established to provide education for the sons of officers who perished during the war.  There were three Nakhimov Schools (Leningrad-1944, Tbilisi-1944, and Riga-1945) but the Tbilisi and Riga schools were closed in 1955 and 1952, respectively.  Only the school in St. Petersburg continues to function until 2016, when the School was expanded to include campuses in major Russian naval base towns.
 Vladivostok Presidential Cadet School 
 Sevastopol Presidential Cadet School 
 Murmansk Nakhimov Naval School
 Kaliningrad Nakhimov Naval School

Presidential Cadet Schools 
Under the Ministry of Defence:

Moscow National Guard Presidential Cadets School
 Kemerovo Presidential Cadet School
Krasnodar Presidential Cadet School
Kyzyl Presidential Cadet School
Orenburg Presidential Cadet School
Petrozavodsk Presidential Cadet School
Stavropol Presidential Cadet School
Tyumen Presidential Cadet School

Cadet Corps schools 
Under the Ministry of Defence:

Aksay Cossack Cadet Corps named after Danilo Efremov
 Kronstadt Sea Cadet Corps - located in Kronshtadt on Kotlin Island this school is for upper grade school aged youths interested in eventually attending the Nakhimov Naval School, a preparatory school for the several officers' commissioning institutions of the Russian Navy.
 Omsk Cadet Military Corps
 Saint Petersburg Cadet Corps
 Cadet Engineering School at the Prof. N. E. Zhukovsky and Yu. A. Gagarin Air Force Academy
 Cadet Sport School at the Military Institute of Physical Culture
 Cadet School of IT-technologies at the Marshal of the Soviet Union S. M. Budyonny Military Signals Academy
 Moscow Female Boarding School of the Ministry of Defence of Russian Federation
 Saint Petersburg Female Boarding School of the Ministry of Defence of Russian Federation

Under the Ministry of Internal Affairs:

 Samara Cadet Corps

See also
 Young Army Cadets National Movement

References

External links 
List of Russian military-focused secondary schools

Military education and training in Russia
Secondary schools in Russia